Louis III (23 January 1378 – 30 December 1436), was an Elector Palatine of the Rhine from the house of Wittelsbach in 1410–1436.

Biography
Louis III was the third son of King Rupert of Germany and his wife Elisabeth of Nuremberg. During his father's campaign in Italy 1401-1402 Louis served as imperial vicar. He succeeded his father in 1410 as Elector of the Palatinate but did not run for the German crown. The Palatinate was divided between the four of Rupert's surviving sons. As oldest surviving son and new Prince-Elector Louis III received the main part, John received Palatinate-Neumarkt, Stephen received Palatinate-Simmern and Otto received Palatinate-Mosbach.

Louis III was a member of the Parakeet Society and of the League of Constance. Highly cultured and religious he was a patron of the Heidelberg University. Louis III acted as vicar for Sigismund, Holy Roman Emperor and was his bearer during the Council of Constance. As such Louis later also executed the sentences against Jan Hus and Jerome of Prague. He also arrested Antipope John XXIII in 1415.

Louis III returned very sick from a pilgrimage in 1427 into the Holy Land which he had organized after the death of his son Ruprecht. From 1430 onwards he was almost blind and in 1435 deprived of power by his wife and her advisors. In the following year he died, in Heidelberg, and was succeeded by his son Louis IV.

Family and children
Louis III was married twice. Firstly, he married on 6 July 1402 Blanche of England (1392 – 21 May 1409), daughter of King Henry IV of England and Mary de Bohun. They had one son Ruprecht (22 May 1406 – 20 May 1426). This marriage brought the Palatine Crown into the hands of the Wittelsbach.

Secondly, he married on 30 November 1417 Matilda of Savoy, daughter of Amadeo, Prince of Achaea. They had five children:
  Mathilde (7 March 1419 – 1 October 1482), married:
 in 1434 to Count Louis I of Württemberg
 in 1452 to Duke Albrecht VI of Austria
 Louis IV, Elector Palatine (1 January 1424 – 13 August 1449)
 Frederick I, Elector Palatine (1 August 1425 – 12 December 1476)
 Rupprecht (27 February 1427 – 26 July 1480), Prince-elector archbishop of Cologne
 Margarete (ca. 1428 – 23 November 1466), a nun at Liebenau monastery

References

Sources

External links
  genealogie-mittelalter.de
  Biography

Wittelsbach, Louis III, Elector Palatine of the Rhine
Wittelsbach, Louis III, Elector Palatine of the Rhin
House of Wittelsbach
Prince-electors of the Palatinate
Burials at the Church of the Holy Spirit, Heidelberg
Sons of kings